Vobiscum may refer to :

Dominus Vobiscum is a liturgical blessing given by Roman Catholic priests during the celebration of the mass.
Pax vobiscum is a salutation in the Roman liturgy.
Vobiscum Satanas Dark Funeral's second full-length album.